Apex Gaming was  a League of Legends team that competed in the North American League of Legends Championship Series (NA LCS). The team was coached primarily by Brandon "Saintvicious" DiMarco and David "Cop" Roberson. Apex Gaming also had a League of Legends Challenger Series team called Apex Pride, which entered the league after Team Dignitas transferred their spot.

History 
Apex Gaming was formed on January 20, 2016, after it acquired Team Imagine's spot in the 2016 NACS Spring Split. After placing 1st in the regular season and in playoffs, Apex qualified for the 2016 NA LCS Summer Split promotion tournament. There, Apex beat Team Dragon Knights in the qualifying round to earn a spot in the NA LCS. On July 8, 2016, support Kevin "KonKwon" Kwon retired from professional gaming. The team finished with a record of 8-10, which earned them a seventh place finish. On September 26, 2016, the Philadelphia 76ers announced their purchase of Apex and Team Dignitas, another esports organization. The Apex Gaming roster was announced to now be playing under the Team Dignitas banner.

Final roster

Tournament results 
 1st — 2016 Summer NA CS
 7th — 2016 Summer North American League of Legends Championship Series

References

See also 
 Team Coast, a defunct team also owned by David Slan

Former North American League of Legends Championship Series teams
Esports teams based in the United States
 
Philadelphia 76ers
Esports teams established in 2016
Esports teams disestablished in 2016